DeAndre James "D. J." Hackett (born July 3, 1981) is a former American football wide receiver. He was drafted by the Seattle Seahawks in the fifth round of the 2004 NFL Draft. He played college football at Colorado.

Hackett has also played for the Carolina Panthers and Washington Redskins.

Early years
DJ Hackett attended grades first through eighth at Pomona First Baptist private school in Pomona California. Hackett attended San Dimas High School in San Dimas, California and was a letterman in football, basketball, and track. In football, as a senior, he won All-Valley Vista League] honors, All-CIF honors, and All-Inland Valley honors, and was named to the Los Angeles All-Star team. Hackett graduated from San Dimas High School in 1999 with a 3.5 grade point average.

College career

Cal State Northridge
In his freshman year at Cal State Northridge, Hackett appeared in 10 of the Matadors' 11 games. He finished the season with 47 receptions for 728 yards and 7 touchdowns, finishing 2nd on the team in all three categories. As a sophomore, Hackett again finished 2nd on the team in receptions (53) and yards (778), and was tied for the team lead in touchdowns (10).

Colorado
When Cal State Northridge dropped its football program at the end of the 2001 season, Hackett transferred to the University of Colorado the following year, appearing in 12 of the team's 13 games.  In 2003 Hackett led all Buffaloes receivers with 1,013 receiving yards and 78 total receptions, scoring 7 touchdowns.

Professional career

Seattle Seahawks
Hackett was drafted in the fifth round of the 2004 NFL Draft by the Seattle Seahawks. Hackett was one of Matt Hasselbecks favorite targets. He played four seasons with the team before becoming a free agent.

Carolina Panthers
On March 17, 2008, Hackett signed a two-year, $3.5 million contract with the Carolina Panthers. He was released after one season with the team on February 25, 2009.

Washington Redskins
Hackett was signed by the Washington Redskins on August 5, 2009 after the team waived/injured Roydell Williams.
On December 5, 2009, he was released.

Personal life
After his time in the NFL, Hackett has lived in Arizona with his family, and started a vending company which provides all-natural and organic foods to schools to help with school nutrition.

Hackett appeared on the game show Family Feud with his family in April of 2014.  The Hackett family did not win the episode.

References

External links

1981 births
Living people
Players of American football from California
People from Fontana, California
American football wide receivers
Cal State Northridge Matadors football players
Colorado Buffaloes football players
Seattle Seahawks players
Sportspeople from Los Angeles County, California
Sportspeople from San Bernardino County, California
Carolina Panthers players
Washington Redskins players
People from San Dimas, California